Dammon may refer to:

 Robert M. Dammon (born 1956), American professor and academic administrator
 Israel Dammon trial, American court case of 1845
 Dammon Round Barn, located southeast of Red Wing, Minnesota, United States

See also
 Damon (disambiguation)